Tremor International Ltd., comprising Tremor Video and Unruly, is a publicly traded advertising-technology company. Founded in 2007, it focuses on digital advertising including video, mobile, native, display technology, and connected TV. Its stock trades on both the Nasdaq and London Stock Exchange under the ticker symbol TRMR.

History

The company was founded as Marimedia in 2007 by Maia Shiran and Ariel Cababie, as an online advertising company. The principal technology platform was launched in 2011 as Ad$Gadget. It was subsequently renamed as Qadabra. It acted as an interface between buyers and sellers of online advertising.

In November 2010, Hagai Tal and Ehud Levy acquired 50% of the company, with Hagai Tal becoming chief executive office in December 2013. Ehud Levy was also a director and investor at Taptica, a mobile advertising technology company from which Marimedia would later take its name. Taptica was founded in 2012 in San Francisco by Sigal Bareket and Kobi Marenko.

In April 2014, Marimedia acquired a purchase option for Taptica in return for extending a $1.5 million credit line. In order to fund the option, Marimedia listed on AIM in London May 2014, raising £17.9 million. Marimedia purchased Taptica for $13.6 million in October 2014.

In May 2015, the company issued a profit warning and said it planned to close its original business of Qadabra and focus solely on Taptica. The company changed its name to Taptica in September 2015.

In September 2015, the company acquired social marketing tech company AreaOne, formerly known as SocialClicks. In 2016, Taptica acquired 57% of Japan-based Adinnovation for $5.7 million. In 2017, Taptica acquired Tremor Video's demand-side platform for $50 million, a company from which they would later take their name.

In December 2018, Hagai Tal stepped down as CEO after a US court ruled that he had concealed material facts during the sale of Plimus in 2011. In 2019, Taptica added an office in Guangzhou, China as part of its Asia expansion.

In February 2019 Taptica merged with RhythmOne. Both companies were listed on the stock exchange, so Taptica retained its listing and RhythmOne shares were converted into Taptica shares. Ofer Druker, the former CEO of Matomy Media, was announced in April 2019 as the CEO of the combined entity. In June 2019 Taptica renamed itself to Tremor International. In 2020, the combined company acquired video ad platform, Unruly, from News Corp. In September of 2022, Tremor International closed its acquisition of Amobee.

Services

Taptica has developed an application that analyzes cell phone users' behaviors, spending and how the previous relate to demographic data such as age, gender and location. Using this data, advertisers would be able to calculate indicators such as KPI and ROI in real-time. Taptica sells advertisements based on complete transactions, such as registering for a game. The platform also enables city-specific user targeting, a feature that increases the effectiveness of ad campaigns. Taptica claims to have stored 200 million user profiles on its platform, with more than 100 data points on each user, in order to provide a precise picture of user behavior to advertisers.

Following a report conducted by the company, showing that native ads give better results, Taptica integrated them into its platform. Taptica claims to be the first company to combine optimization for direct marketing and real-time bidding, a feature that will reportedly allow advertisers to conduct targeted campaigns. The company's portfolio has almost 1,000 publishing partners and 250 brands that are engaged in gaming, internet radio, travel and retail industries. Taptica's clientele includes EA, GREE, ngmoco, Hotel Tonight, Playtika and Game Insight among others.

Awards

For the years 2015 to 2017, Taptica was named to Deloitte's Tech Fast 50 list. At Digiday Signal Awards 2017, Taptica won Best Social Advertising Platform.
In 2017, Taptica was listed as AppsFlyer's fastest-rising partner for installs and retention and by 2018 the company ranked in the top ten across various categories and geographies.

In October 2017, Interactive Investor reported that Taptica led the list for "International Company of the Year" at the UK-based AIM public company awards.

References

2012 establishments in the United States
Companies based in San Francisco
Companies listed on the London Stock Exchange
Companies listed on the Nasdaq
2021 initial public offerings